LY294002 is a morpholine-containing chemical compound that is a potent inhibitor of numerous proteins, and a strong inhibitor of phosphoinositide 3-kinases (PI3Ks). It is generally considered a non-selective research tool, and should not be used for experiments aiming to target PI3K uniquely.

Two of these are the proto-oncogene serine/threonine-protein kinase (PIM1) and the phosphatidylinositol-4,5-bisphosphate 3-kinase P110 gamma|catalytic subunit gamma isoform.  With an IC50 of 1.4 μM it is somewhat less potent than wortmannin, another well-known PI3 kinase inhibitor. However, LY294002 is a reversible inhibitor of PI3K whereas wortmannin acts irreversibly.

Application of LY294002 causes a substantial acceleration of MEPP frequency (150 μM) at the frog neuromuscular junction through a mechanism that is independent of intraterminal calcium. LY294002 causes the release of MEPPs through a perturbation of synaptotagmin function.

LY294002 is also a BET inhibitor (e.g. of BRD2, BRD3, and BRD4).

Application

Research
It has been shown that LY294002 administration has an additive effect on quercetin antiviral activity against hepatitis C virus.

References 

4-Morpholinyl compunds
Chromones
Phosphoinositide 3-kinase inhibitors